Johan Johannesen (20 April 1898 – 30 September 1979) was a Norwegian track and field athlete who competed in the 1920 Summer Olympics. In 1920 he finished tenth in the long jump competition.

References

External links
list of Norwegian athletes  (as Johan Johansen)

1898 births
1979 deaths
Norwegian male long jumpers
Olympic athletes of Norway
Athletes (track and field) at the 1920 Summer Olympics
20th-century Norwegian people